Take It Easy is a 1974 Polish comedy film directed by Sylwester Chęciński. It is the second part of a trilogy about two quarreling peasants Kargul and Pawlak, which started with Sami swoi, and concluded with Kochaj albo rzuć. The title is Polish idiom, literally translating as "There is no one powerful enough".

Cast 
 Wacław Kowalski − Kazimierz Pawlak
 Władysław Hańcza − Władysław Kargul
 Anna Dymna − Ania Pawlakówna
 Andrzej Wasilewicz − Zenek Adamiec, narzeczony Ani
 Maria Zbyszewska − Pawlakowa
 Halina Buyno-Łoza − Kargulowa
 Jerzy Janeczek − Witia Pawlak
 Ilona Kuśmierska − Jadźka

External links 

1974 comedy films
1974 films
Polish comedy films